Torbjörn Sjöstrand (born 13 November 1954) is a Swedish theoretical physicist and a professor at Lund University in Sweden, where he also got his PhD in 1982. He is one of the main authors of PYTHIA, a program for generation of high-energy physics events.

In his early career, Sjöstrand spent shorter postdoc periods at DESY (Germany) and Fermilab (USA). From 1989 to 1995 he was staff member in the CERN Theory division.

Honours
In 2012, he was awarded the J. J. Sakurai Prize for Theoretical Particle Physics by the American Physical Society. The citation reads:

In 2021, he was awarded the High Energy and Particle Physics Prize of the European Physical Society for the development of PYTHIA. He received the award together with Bryan Webber, who was also a co-recipient of the Sakurai Prize.

References

J. J. Sakurai Prize for Theoretical Particle Physics recipients
Academic staff of Lund University
Theoretical physicists
Swedish physicists
Living people
1954 births

People associated with CERN